The Raja Lakhamagouda Science Institute is an autonomous education institution run by Karnatak Lingayat Education Society in Belagavi city. It was established in 1935 and was named after the head of the former princely state Vantamuri, Raja Lakhamagouda Saradesai in 1941 who had donated 20,000 to the institute. Initially, the institute was a part of Lingaraj Arts college, Belagavi. It started as a science wing in Lingaraj Arts college, and was separated in 1958. In 1944, the noble laureate Sir C. V. Raman inaugurated the degree course in science in the institute.

References

Universities and colleges in Belgaum
1935 establishments in India
Educational institutions established in 1935